We Fall is the debut studio album by American music producer Emile Haynie, released on February 24, 2015, by Interscope Records. The album features guest appearances from Andrew Wyatt, Brian Wilson, Rufus Wainwright, Lana Del Rey, Charlotte Gainsbourg, Sampha, Dev Hynes, Nate Ruess, Colin Blunstone, Lykke Li, Romy Madley Croft, Randy Newman, Father John Misty, Thomas Bartlett a.k.a. Doveman and Julia Holter.

Background
Emile Haynie began his musical career producing hip hop music for several prominent rappers in the industry, such as Eminem, Obie Trice, Raekwon, Ghostface Killah, Proof, Remy Ma, Ice Cube and Rhymefest, among others. In 2009, Haynie teamed up with Plain Pat and Kid Cudi, to launch their record label, Dream On. In 2010, Haynie produced the song "Runaway" for Cudi's GOOD Music label-boss, Kanye West. The song quickly became a hit single, peaking at number 12 on the US Billboard Hot 100 chart and subsequently raised Haynie's profile  in the music industry. The following year, Haynie began working with American indie pop singer Lana Del Rey, producing eight singles from her Born to Die album, namely the title-track, "Off to the Races", "Carmen", "Blue Jeans", "Summertime Sadness", "National Anthem", "Blue Velvet" and "Dark Paradise". In late 2012, American pop singer Bruno Mars released the single "Locked Out of Heaven", which was produced by Haynie alongside The Smeezingtons, Mark Ronson and Jeff Bhasker. "Locked Out of Heaven" went on to become certified 4× platinum by the Recording Industry Association of America (RIAA). On January 19, 2015, after having much success as a producer, Haynie announced he would be releasing his debut studio album, titling it We Fall.
 Haynie revealed We Fall, is a narrative that details his recovery from a shattered romance.

Recording and production
The recording process began when Haynie traveled from his New York City home, for a stay in Los Angeles for the 56th Annual Grammy Awards, which stretched into six months in room 39, of the famed Chateau Marmont. To record the album, Haynie called upon his longtime friends and close colleagues he's made throughout the years in the music industry : "I made the album with mostly my friends, who knew what I was going through. I wanted to put the relationship under a microscope, and relive all my emotions, from being pissed off and hurt to a sense of relief."

Release and promotion
"Falling Apart," the album's first single, featuring Andrew Wyatt and Brian Wilson, was serviced to Triple A and non-commercial radio in January. The single is also available as a 12-inch vinyl single exclusively at indie retailers with album pre-order on February 3, 2015.

On January 20, 2015, Haynie released "Wait for Life", which features vocals from Lana Del Rey, as a promotional single along with pre-order for the album.

On February 10, 2015, Haynie released "Come Find Me", featuring Lykke Li and The xx's Romy Madley Croft.

Critical reception

At Metacritic, which assigns a normalized rating out of 100 to reviews from mainstream critics, the album has an average score of 70 based on six reviews, indicating "generally favorable reviews". Aimee Cliff of The Fader complimented the album, writing, "It's a singular achievement for a debut, and one that could only have been pulled off by Haynie, who over the last 15 years has gradually become the go-to producer for pop's biggest names."

Track listing
All tracks produced by Emile Haynie, except "Falling Apart" and "A Kiss Goodbye", which were co-produced by Haynie and John Hill.

See also
 Emile Haynie production discography

References

External links
 

2015 debut albums
Albums produced by Emile Haynie
Emile Haynie albums
Interscope Records albums